A general election was held in the U.S. state of Arizona on November 6, 2018. All of Arizona's executive offices were up for election as well as a United States Senate seat and all of Arizona's nine seats in the United States House of Representatives. The Republican Party won the majority of statewide offices, albeit by much narrower margins than in previous elections (except for the governorship, which they won easily), while the Democratic Party picked up three statewide offices.

U.S. Senate

Incumbent Republican Jeff Flake was eligible to run for re-election to a second term. As a strong critic of President Donald Trump and remaining unpopular in the state, Flake announced in October 2017 that he would not seek reelection.

President Trump and Republicans backed Martha McSally to succeed Flake. Kelli Ward, former State Senator and candidate for the U.S. Senate in 2016 also ran for the Republican nomination for the open seat.

Results

On the evening of Monday, November 12, 2018, McSally posted on her Twitter that she had spoken with Sinema and conceded. Sinema celebrated with supporters later that evening.

U.S. House of Representatives

Seven of nine incumbents in the United States House of Representatives ran for re-election in 2018, and all won. The primary elections took place on August 28, 2018. The general elections took place on November 6, 2018, and the open 2nd district flipped from Republican to Democratic.

Winners are in Bold

Governor

Incumbent Republican Governor Doug Ducey won re-election to a second term.

Results

Secretary of State

Incumbent Republican Secretary of State Michele Reagan lost the nomination for a second term to Steve Gaynor, who lost the general election to Democratic state senator Katie Hobbs.

Democratic primary

Candidates

Declared
 Katie Hobbs, minority leader of the Arizona State Senate

Removed
 Leslie Pico, businesswoman

Withdrew
 Mark Robert Gordon, attorney

Declined
 Greg Stanton, mayor of Phoenix (ran for U.S. House of Representatives)

Primary results

Republican primary

Candidates

Declared
 Steve Gaynor, businessman
 Michele Reagan, incumbent Secretary of State

Declined
 Kevin Gibbons, home loan officer
 Steve Montenegro, former state senator and candidate for Arizona's 8th congressional district in a 2018 special election

Primary results

Libertarian primary

Candidates

Declared
 Jenn Gray (write-in candidate)

Primary results

General election
Governing magazine projected the race as "likely Republican".

Polling

Results

Attorney General

Incumbent Republican Attorney General Mark Brnovich won re-election to a second term.

Republican primary

Candidates

Declared
 Mark Brnovich, incumbent Attorney General, former director of the Arizona Department of Gaming, and former Assistant U.S. Attorney for the U.S. District Court of Arizona

Primary results

Democratic primary

Candidates
 January Contreras, former director of Arizona Department of Health Services and senior advisor to former U.S. Homeland Security Secretary Janet Napolitano

Primary results

Libertarian primary

Candidates

Declared
 Michael Kielsky (write-in candidate)

Primary results

Endorsements

General election

Polling

Results

State Treasurer
Incumbent Republican State Treasurer Jeff DeWit announced on April 6, 2016, that he would not run for re-election to a second term as State Treasurer. DeWit resigned in April 2018 to become CFO of NASA and his replacement, Eileen Klein, announced that she would not be running for re-election.

Republican primary

Candidates

Declared
 Jo Ann Sabbagh, accountant
 Kimberly Yee, state senator

Withdrew
 Thomas Forese, Corporation Commissioner

Endorsements

Primary results

Democratic primary

Candidates

Declared
 Mark Manoil, attorney and former chairman of the Maricopa County Democratic Party

Declined
 Mark Cardenas, state representative
 William Mundell, former Corporation Commissioner (ran for Arizona Corporation Commission)

Primary results

General election

Polling

Results

Superintendent of Public Instruction

Incumbent Republican Superintendent of Public Instruction Diane Douglas ran for re-election to a second term and lost to Frank Riggs in a close five-way primary. Riggs lost to Democratic teacher Kathy Hoffman in the general election

Republican primary

Candidates
 Robert Branch, Grand Canyon University professor
 Diane Douglas, incumbent Superintendent of Public Instruction
 Jonathan Gelbart, director of charter school development for Basis Schools
 Tracy Livingston, Maricopa County Community College District board member
 Frank Riggs, former U.S. Representative for California's 1st congressional district (1995–1999), candidate for U.S. Senate for California in 1998, candidate for Governor of Arizona in 2006 and 2014

Endorsements

Primary results

Democratic primary

Candidates

Declared
 Kathy Hoffman, Peoria Unified School District speech therapist
 David Schapira, high school administrator for the East Valley Institute of Technology and former state senator (2011–2013)

Primary results

General election

Polling

Results

Mine Inspector
Incumbent Republican Mine Inspector Joe Hart won re-election to a fourth term.

Republican primary

Candidates

Declared
 Joe Hart, incumbent Mine Inspector

Primary results

Democratic primary

Candidates

Declared
 William Pierce, engineer

Primary results

Libertarian primary

Candidates

Declared
 Kim Ruff (write-in candidate)

Primary results

General election

Results

Corporation Commission
"Corporation Commissioners must only satisfy the standard requirements for all Arizona state officers, who must be at least 18 years old, a citizen of the United States and able to speak English." Two of the seats on the Arizona Corporation Commission are up for election, elected by plurality block voting.

Republican primary

Candidates

Declared
 Tom Forese, incumbent Corporation Commissioner
 Rodney Glassman, former Tucson city councilman and Democratic nominee for U.S. Senate in 2010
 James "Jim" O'Connor, former investment law advisor for the California State Senate
 Justin Olson, incumbent Corporation Commissioner
 Eric Sloan, small business owner

Declined
 Doug Little, former Corporation Commissioner (2015–2017)

Endorsements

Primary results

Democratic primary

Candidates

Declared
 Sandra Kennedy, former Corporation Commissioner (2009–2013), former state senator (1993–2000), and former state representative (1987–1992)
 William Mundell, former Republican Corporation Commissioner (1999–2009) and former Republican state representative (1986–1992)
 Kiana Sears, Mesa Public Schools governing board member

Primary results

General election

Results

Arizona State Legislature

All 30 members of the Arizona State Senate and all 60 members of the Arizona House of Representatives were up for election.

State ballot measures

  Prop 125 (HCR2032): Related to Public Retirement Systems
  Prop 126 (C-05-2018): "The Protect Arizona Taxpayers Act"
  Prop 127 (C-04-2018): "Clean Energy for a Healthy Arizona Amendment"
  Prop 305 (R-02-2018): "Save Our Schools Arizona"
  Prop 306 (HCR2007): Related to the Citizens Clean Elections Act

References

External links
 Candidate Debates from Citizens Clean Elections Commission
 Candidates at Vote Smart
 Candidates at Ballotpedia
 Campaign finance at OpenSecrets

Ballot measures
 Ballot Measure Information
 Ballot Measures and Analyses

Election Results
 Arizona Primary Election Results
 Arizona General Election Results

Official Secretary of State campaign websites
 Steve Gaynor (R) for Secretary of State
 Katie Hobbs (D) for Secretary of State

Official Attorney General campaign websites
 Mark Brnovich (R) for Attorney General
 January Contreras (D) for Attorney General

Official State Treasurer campaign websites
 Mark Manoil (D) for State Treasurer 
 Kimberly Yee (R) for State Treasurer

Official Superintendent of Public Instruction campaign websites
 Kathy Hoffman (D) for Superintendent
 Frank Riggs (R) for Superintendent

Official Mine Inspector campaign websites
 Bill Pierce (D) for Mine Inspector

Official Corporation Commission campaign websites
 Rodney Glassman (R) for Corporation Commissioner
 Sandra Kennedy (D) for Corporation Commissioner
 Justin Olson (R) for Corporation Commissioner
 Kiana Sears (D) for Corporation Commissioner

 
Arizona